The 2019 Golden Movie Awards  is an African film award ceremony that was hosted at the Movenpick Ambassador Hotel in Accra, Ghana.

Winners 
The results of the 2019 awards were as follows:

References

Further reading 

 
 
 

Golden Movie Awards